Dumlugöze is a village in Sarıveliler district of  Karaman Province, Turkey. It is a high-altitude mountain village situated at the extreme south west of the province. The population of the village  was 1715 as of 2010.

References

Villages in Karaman Province
Sarıveliler District